Bossiaea leptacantha is a species of flowering plant in the family Fabaceae and is endemic to southern Western Australia. It is a low, compact, spreading, many-branched shrub, the branches ending in cladodes, the leaves reduced to small scales, and with deep yellow, red and greenish yellow flowers.

Description

Taxonomy and naming
Bossiaea leptacantha was first formally described in 1904 by Ernst Georg Pritzel in the Botanische Jahrbücher für Systematik, Pflanzengeschichte und Pflanzengeographie. The specific epithet (leptacantha) means "thin and prickly", referring to the branchlets.

Distribution and habitat
This bossiaea grows in sand on dunes and undulating plains from near Peak Charles to Madura in the Coolgardie, Hampton and Mallee biogeographic regions of southern Western Australia.

Conservation status
Bossiaea leptacantha is classified as "not threatened" by the Government of Western Australia Department of Parks and Wildlife.

References

leptacantha
Mirbelioids
Flora of Western Australia
Plants described in 1904
Taxa named by Ernst Pritzel